Heksagon Tarn is the lake on the northwest coast of South Bay, Livingston Island in the South Shetland Islands, Antarctica extending 140 m in west–east direction and 100 m in south–north direction. It has a surface area of 1.04 ha and is situated 130 m from the sea. The area was visited by early 19th century sealers.

The feature is so named because of its supposed hexagon shape ('heksagon' in Bulgarian).

Location
British mapping of the area in 1968 and Bulgarian in 2009 and 2017.

Maps

 Livingston Island to King George Island. Scale 1:200000.  Admiralty Nautical Chart 1776.  Taunton: UK Hydrographic Office, 1968
 South Shetland Islands. Scale 1:200000 topographic map No. 3373. DOS 610 - W 62 58. Tolworth, UK, 1968
 L. Ivanov. Antarctica: Livingston Island and Greenwich, Robert, Snow and Smith Islands. Scale 1:120000 topographic map. Troyan: Manfred Wörner Foundation, 2010.  (First edition 2009. )
 L. Ivanov. Antarctica: Livingston Island and Smith Island. Scale 1:100000 topographic map. Manfred Wörner Foundation, 2017. 
 Antarctic Digital Database (ADD). Scale 1:250000 topographic map of Antarctica. Scientific Committee on Antarctic Research (SCAR). Since 1993, regularly upgraded and updated

Notes

References
 Bulgarian Antarctic Gazetteer. Antarctic Place-names Commission. (details in Bulgarian, basic data in English)

External links
 Heksagon Tarn. Adjusted Copernix satellite image

Bodies of water of Livingston Island
Lakes of the South Shetland Islands
Bulgaria and the Antarctic